Paul Thomas Lucas (born 9 July 1962) is a former Australian politician who served as the Attorney-General of Queensland and Minister for Local Government and Special Minister of State in the Bligh Government and the Member for Lytton from 1996 until his retirement at the 2012 state election. Lucas was a solicitor prior to entering Parliament, and has a bachelor's degrees in Economics and in Law and a Master of Business Administration.

Political career

Lucas was elected to the Queensland Parliament in October 1996 at a by-election for the seat of Lytton, vacated by former Deputy Premier Tom Burns.

Lucas was previously the Deputy Premier and Minister for Infrastructure and Planning between September 2007 and March 2009. Lucas served as Minister for Transport and Main Roads between 2004 and 2007. Prior to that he was Minister for Innovation and Information Economy, with ministerial responsibility for Energy between 2001 and 2004.

Lucas was once under investigation for electoral malpractice in the Shepherdson Inquiry, but he was cleared of any wrongdoing.

While Lucas was Minister for Transport, he was issued a speeding ticket, which his driver paid for instead due to a mix-up. The incident attracted much negative attention from the media and the public.

There were calls for his resignation over the bungled rollout of a payroll system for Queensland Health workers in 2010. An online petition was started by the Queensland Public Sector Union as part of a campaign to force Lucas to resign after the Auditor-General released a report which heavily criticised the implementation of the new payroll system.

On 15 September 2011, Lucas announced he would step down as Deputy Premier the following day and would retire from the parliament at the next election.

Community affiliations
Lucas belongs to many community organisations, including the Wynnum Manly Leagues Club, and is a patron of organisations such as Bay FM, Wynnum Softball Association, Eastern districts Orchid Society Inc and the Aid and Recreational Association for the Disabled and Wynnum Table Tennis. He was also a founding member of the Bayside Community Legal Service. He has played an important role in environmental issues, in particular fighting for a buffer zone between residential areas of Wynnum North and the Port of Brisbane. He has also worked to ensure that the Wynnum Manly community has benefited from the economic development of the Port and the Australia TradeCoast area.

Personal life
On 20 January 2010, upon release from the Mater Private Hospital in Brisbane, Lucas admitted to having suffered an epileptic seizure but that he had returned to work and was "fighting fit", providing an example to the community that people with chronic medical conditions can participate fully in public life.

References

1962 births
Living people
Members of the Queensland Legislative Assembly
Australian solicitors
Deputy Premiers of Queensland
People educated at Villanova College (Australia)
Attorneys-General of Queensland
Politicians from Brisbane
Australian Labor Party members of the Parliament of Queensland
21st-century Australian politicians